Anthomyia mimetica is a species of root-maggot fly in the family Anthomyiidae. It is found in Europe.

References

Anthomyiidae
Articles created by Qbugbot
Insects described in 1918
Taxa named by John Russell Malloch